Entranceway at Main Street at Westfield Road and Ivyhurst Road is a suburban residential subdivision entranceway built about 1920 by John Sattler.  It is located on Main Street (New York State Route 5) in the town of Amherst within Erie County.  It consists of stone posts, connecting quarter-height stone walls, and accent light fixtures located on either street corner.

It was added to the National Register of Historic Places in 2009.

References

Buildings and structures on the National Register of Historic Places in New York (state)
Buildings and structures completed in 1920
Buildings and structures in Erie County, New York
National Register of Historic Places in Erie County, New York